The Solis Viaduct is a single track eleven-arched limestone railway viaduct. It spans the Albula east of the hamlet of Solis, in the canton of Graubünden, Switzerland.

Designed by the engineer Hans Studer, it was built in 1902 by Munari, Cayre und Marasi for the Rhaetian Railway, which still owns and uses it today.

Location
The Solis Viaduct forms part of the Albula Railway section between Thusis and Tiefencastel, and is at the  mark from Thusis. East of the viaduct is the Stausee Solis.

Description
The limestone-built viaduct was conceived by Hans Studer as the first stone arch bridge in Switzerland to be designed in accordance with the elasticity theory. That choice of design allowed the use of a parabolic arch, and thus a very slim form of construction. Building costs could thereby be limited to 125,000 Swiss francs at 1902 prices.

Renovation
In 1997, the viaduct was renovated at great expense. The previous isolation between the gravel bed and walls was filled in by a new sealing system, incorporating liquid plastic film and shotcrete. In addition, the rails and ballast were renewed.

Gallery

See also

Bernina Express
Glacier Express

References

See  the  references in Soliser Viadukt (de Wikipedia)

External links

 
 

Viaducts in Switzerland
Rhaetian Railway bridges
Monuments and memorials in Switzerland
World Heritage Sites in Switzerland
Buildings and structures in Graubünden
Bridges completed in 1902
1902 establishments in Switzerland
Stone arch bridges
20th-century architecture in Switzerland